The following is a list of the MTV Europe Music Award winners and nominees for Best French Act.

Winners and nominees
Winners are listed first and highlighted in bold.

1990s

2000s

2010s

2020s

Local Hero Award — France

References

MTV Europe Music Awards
French music awards
Awards established in 2000